The following are the association football events of the year 1900 throughout the world.

Events
28 January: German Football Association founded in Leipzig.
Germany: 1. FC Nürnberg, Alemannia Aachen, 1. FC Kaiserslautern and FC Bayern Munich is founded.
Italy: S.S. Lazio is founded.
Netherlands: NEC Nijmegen and Ajax Amsterdam is founded.
Brazil: AA Ponte Preta and Sport Club Rio Grande are founded.

National champions

Argentina: English High School
Belgium: Racing Club de Bruxelles
England: Aston Villa
France: Le Havre
Ireland: Belfast Celtic
Italy: Genoa

Netherlands: HVV Den Haag
Scotland: 
Division One: Rangers
Scottish Cup: Celtic
Sweden: AIK
Switzerland: Grasshopper Zurich
Uruguay: CURCC (first winners of Primera División Uruguaya)

International tournaments
1900 British Home Championship (3 February – 7 April 1900)

Olympic Games in Paris, France (20–28 October 1900)
  Great Britain

Births
 30 March – Santos Urdinarán, Uruguayan footballer
 20 May – Lorenzo Fernández, Uruguayan footballer
 1 September – Pedro Cea, Uruguayan footballer

References 

 
Association football by year